Maria Kirilenko and Maria Sharapova were the defending champions but lost in the first round to Marion Bartoli and Tamarine Tanasugarn.

Daniela Hantuchová and Ai Sugiyama won in the final 6–2, 6–3 against Eleni Daniilidou and Jennifer Russell.

Seeds
Champion seeds are indicated in bold text while text in italics indicates the round in which those seeds were eliminated.

  Cara Black /  Liezel Huber (semifinals)
  Daniela Hantuchová /  Ai Sugiyama (champions)
  Nicole Pratt /  María Vento-Kabchi (quarterfinals)
  Bryanne Stewart /  Samantha Stosur (semifinals)

Draw

Main draw

Qualifying draw

References
 2005 DFS Classic Draws
 ITF Tournament Page
 ITF doubles results page
 ITF doubles qualifying results page

DFS Classic - Doubles
Doubles